The men's singles three-cushion billiards competition at the 2009 World Games took place from 22 to 26 July 2009 at the Chung Cheng Martial Arts Stadium in Kaohsiung, Taiwan.

Last 16

Last 8

References

Three-cushion billiard - men's singles
Three-cushion billiards competitions